Igor Cassina (born 15 August 1977) is an Italian gymnast who won gold in the men's horizontal bar at the 2004 Summer Olympics in Athens.

Biography
At the 2004 Summer Olympics, his competition saw a crowd protest over a low score for a routine by Alexei Nemov of Russia, which lasted for fifteen minutes until the score was raised. Despite this atmosphere, Cassina performed his exercise without major error, and he took the gold medal over Paul Hamm of the U.S., even though they tied. This gold was also the 500th Italian medal at the Summer Olympics. At the 2008 Summer Olympics he was 4th in the man's horizontal bar.

At the World Gymnastics Championships, he won the silver medal in Anaheim 2003 and the bronze in London 2009. At the European Gymnastics Championships, he won silver in Patras 2002 and Debrecen 2005 and bronze in Amsterdam 2007, always on the horizontal bar. Before winning the Olympic gold, Cassina had already made gymnastics history as the first to perform a giant Kovacs straight with 1/1 turn (also known as a Kõlman in the straight position), which the International Gymnastics Federation named Cassina after him as of 2002.

References

External links
 
 

1977 births
Living people
People from Seregno
Italian male artistic gymnasts
Olympic gymnasts of Italy
Olympic gold medalists for Italy
Gymnasts at the 2000 Summer Olympics
Gymnasts at the 2004 Summer Olympics
Gymnasts at the 2008 Summer Olympics
Medalists at the World Artistic Gymnastics Championships
Olympic medalists in gymnastics
Medalists at the 2004 Summer Olympics
Università Cattolica del Sacro Cuore alumni
Mediterranean Games silver medalists for Italy
Competitors at the 2001 Mediterranean Games
Mediterranean Games medalists in gymnastics
Originators of elements in artistic gymnastics
Sportspeople from the Province of Monza e Brianza